Prayers for the Blessed  (referred to as Prayers for the Blessed, Vol. 2 on its album cover) is the fifth and final studio album by American rock band Sixx:A.M. It is the second half of the Prayers for the Damned/Blessed double album. The first half, Prayers for the Damned was released seven months earlier.

Track listing

Credits

DJ Ashba – lead guitar, composer, backing vocals
James Michael – lead vocals, keyboards, composer
Nikki Sixx – bass guitar, composer, backing vocals
 Dustin Steinke – drums

References

2016 albums
Eleven Seven Label Group albums